Calicotis crucifera, the leather-leaf spore-eater, is a moth of the Stathmopodidae family. It is found in New Zealand and Australia.

Description 
The mature larva of C. crucifera are approximately 6mm long and are a white colour, plump with a pale brown head. The wings of the adult are grey with dark specks.

Behaviour 
The larvae of this species can be observed on the underneath of the fronds of its host species. The larva builds silk tubes disguised with fern spore dust and white frond hair. They feed on the fern spores. Larvae can be seen most months of the year. The adult is on the wing from January to May.

Host plant 
The larvae feed on the spores of the fern, Pyrrosia eleagnifolia.

References

Moths described in 1889
Stathmopodidae
Moths of New Zealand
Taxa named by Edward Meyrick
Moths of Australia